Andkhoy may refer to:

Andkhoy District, a district in Faryab Province, Afghanistan
Andkhoy (city) , a city and the center of the above district in Faryab Province, Afghanistan